|}

The Midsummer Sprint Stakes is a Listed flat horse race in Ireland open to thoroughbreds aged three years or older. It is run at Cork over a distance of 5 furlongs (1,006 metres), and it is scheduled to take place each year in June.

The race was first run in 2011.

Winners

See also
 Horse racing in Ireland
 List of Irish flat horse races

References
Racing Post:

Flat races in Ireland
Cork Racecourse
Open sprint category horse races
2011 establishments in Ireland
Recurring sporting events established in 2011